Diane Prince may refer to:
 Diane Prince (rower)
 Diane Prince (artist)

See also
 Diana Prince, a fictional character, the secret identity of the superhero Wonder Woman